Gad Ami is the pseudonym of Amivi Gadegbeku (born 1958), a French-language novelist from Togo. She was the first woman novelist in Togo.

Life
In 2001 she moved to live in the United States.

Works
 Etrange héritage: roman [Strange heritage: a novel]. Lomé: Nouvelles Editions africaines, 1985. 
 La croix de la mariée: roman [The bride's cross: a novel]. Cotonou, République du Bénin: Les Éditions du Flamboyant: Émeraude Éditions, 2014.

References

1958 births
Living people
Togolese novelists
Togolese women writers
21st-century Togolese people